Alex Kemp was a Scottish association football full back who played professionally in Canada and the United States.

Kemp began his career in Canada, playing for Grand Trunk Railway and Boleil.  In 1922, he joined the Fall River Marksmen of the American Soccer League.  In 1924, Kemp played on the backline for the Marksmen when they defeated St. Louis Vesper Buick in the final of the 1924 National Challenge Cup.  Kemp's handball in the area led to Vesper Buick's first goal in the 36th minute.  In 1925, he played two games for the New Bedford Whalers and one for Philadelphia Field Club before moving to Detroit and joining Holley Carburetor F.C.

External links

References

American Soccer League (1921–1933) players
Fall River Marksmen players
Detroit Holley Carburetor players
New Bedford Whalers players
Philadelphia Field Club players
Scottish footballers
Scottish expatriate footballers
Expatriate soccer players in Canada
Expatriate soccer players in the United States
Place of birth missing
Association football fullbacks
Scottish expatriate sportspeople in the United States
Year of birth missing
Year of death missing